Edward Chichester may refer to:

Edward Chichester, 1st Viscount Chichester (1568–1648)
Edward Chichester, 4th Marquess of Donegall (1799–1889), Irish peer
Edward Chichester, 6th Marquess of Donegall (1903–1975), British peer and journalist
Sir Edward John Chichester, 11th Baronet
Sir Edward Chichester, 9th Baronet (1849–1906) of the Chichester baronets
Sir Edward George Chichester, 10th Baronet (1888–1940) of the Chichester baronets
Sir (Edward), John Chichester, 11th Baronet (1916–2007) of the Chichester baronets
Edward Chichester (priest), Irish Anglican priest

See also
Chichester baronets
Chichester (disambiguation)